In neurosurgery, excimer laser assisted non-occlusive anastomosis (ELANA) is a technique use to create a bypass without interrupting the blood supply in the recipient blood vessels. This reduces the risk of stroke or a rupture of an aneurysm.

The ELANA technique is a subtle modification of other methods to establish a connection between blood vessels (anastomosis) to create a bypass in or to the brain. The differences involve how the recipient artery is opened. In conventional techniques, the recipient artery is temporarily interrupted (occluded with clips) and opened using microscissors or scalpel, while in the ELANA technique blood flow is not interrupted and the opening (arteriotomy) is created with radiation from a 308 nm excimer laser delivered through a catheter inserted in the vessel that will become the bypass while blood continues to flow through the artery that receives the bypass. This difference reduces the risk of ischemia to the regions supplied by the artery receiving the bypass. The technique is most valuable in neurosurgery, as brain cells are particularly sensitive to the lack of blood supply (ischemia), including those created by older methods of bypass. Bypasses created with the help of the ELANA can be to major arteries in the brain, including extracranial to intracranial bypass, or between two arteries in the brain (intracranial to intracranial).

Surgeons create these bypasses mainly as a step in the treatment of patients with unclippable and uncoilable giant aneurysms or tumors at the base of the skull or to treat patients at risk of stroke who can not otherwise be treated.

The ELANA technique has been extensively described in medical literature. It was developed starting in 1993 to find a way to treat patients with a bypass to a major cerebral artery without the risk of cerebral ischemia during the procedure. This technique has been reported by the general news media.

References

Neurosurgical procedures